Hyde Abbey School was a British independent school in Winchester, Hampshire, UK.

The school was founded by the Reverend Reynell Cotton in around 1760. Cotton was succeeded as headmaster by his son-in-law, the Reverend Charles Richards.

In 1795, Sir John Soane constructed a dedicated schoolroom for the school – his only building in Winchester. By 1847, the school had closed and its building was taken on a lease as the first Hampshire Museum.

Alumni 
Alumni include:
 Edmund Lyons, 1st Baron Lyons, Commander of the Royal Navy Black Sea Fleet in the Crimean War
 Henry John Chitty Harper, former Primate of New Zealand
 Thomas Garnier, former Dean of Winchester
 George Canning, former Prime Minister of the United Kingdom
 Henry Sewell, first Prime Minister of New Zealand
 Thomas Gaisford, former Dean of Christ Church
 Charles Wolfe, the Irish poet
 General Sir George Augustus Wetherall
 George Moberly, former Bishop of Salisbury and Headmaster of Winchester College
 Thomas Townsend, former Bishop of Meath
 William Piercy Austin, former Bishop of Guyana
 Sir Anthony Oliphant, former Chief Justice of Ceylon.

References 

Educational institutions established in the 18th century
Schools in Winchester
Defunct schools in Hampshire